The 9th Parliament of Sri Lanka was a meeting of the Parliament of Sri Lanka, with the membership determined by the results of the 1989 parliamentary election held on 15 February 1989. The parliament met for the first time on 9 March 1989 and was dissolved on 24 June 1994.

Election

The 9th parliamentary election was held on 15 February 1989. The incumbent United National Party (UNP) retained control of parliament by winning 125 of the 225 seats. The Sri Lanka Freedom Party (SLFP), the main opposition party, won 67 seats. The Eelam Revolutionary Organisation of Students (EROS), a Tamil militant group, won 13 seats contesting as independent groups whilst an alliance of Tamil parties (TULF/ENDLF/EPRLF/TELO) won 10 seats. Smaller parties won the remaining 10 seats.

Results

The new parliament was sworn in on 9 March 1989. M. H. Mohamed was elected Speaker, Gamini Fonseka was elected Deputy Speaker and Ariya B. Rekawa was elected Deputy Chairman of Committees.

Government

On 3 March 1989 President Ranasinghe Premadasa appointed D. B. Wijetunga as Prime Minister. The rest of the government had been appointed earlier on 18 February 1989.

President Premadasa was assassinated on 1 May 1993. Parliament elected Prime Minister Wijetunga to succeed President Premadasa and was duly sworn in on 7 May 1993. On the same day President Wijetunga appointed Ranil Wickremasinghe to be the new Prime Minister.

President Wijetunga dissolved parliament on 24 June 1994, several months earlier than he need to.

Changes in party/alliance affiliations
The 9th parliament saw the following defections:

Deaths and resignations
The 9th parliament saw the following deaths and resignations:
25 June 1989: Anura Daniel Mahavithanaarachchige (UNP-KAN) murdered. His replacement was Gemunu Rajendranth Abeysundre (UNP-KAN).
13 July 1989: Appapillai Amirthalingam (TULF-NAT) murdered. His replacement was Mavai Senathirajah (TULF-NAT).
11 May 1990: Thambimuthu Sam Pennington Thevarasa (EPRLF-BAT) murdered. His replacement was Joseph Pararajasingham (TULF-BAT).
19 June 1990: Ganeshankari Yogasangari (EPRLF-JAF) murdered.
2 March 1991: Ranjan Wijeratne (UNP-NAT) murdered.
23 April 1993: Lalith Athulathmudali (DUNF-COL) murdered.
7 May 1993: DB Wijetunga Took the office of president.

Members

References
 

Parliament of Sri Lanka
1989 Sri Lankan parliamentary election